The Xbox Series X and Series S are the fourth generation of the Xbox series of home video game consoles developed and sold by Microsoft. Released on November 10, 2020, the higher-end Xbox Series X and lower-end Xbox Series S are part of the ninth generation of video game consoles, which also includes Sony's PlayStation 5, released the same month. They superseded the Xbox One.

In early 2019, rumors emerged of a fourth generation of Xbox consoles (codenamed "Scarlett") that consisted of a high-end model ("Anaconda") and a lower-end model ("Lockhart"). Microsoft teased Anaconda in June 2019 during E3 2019 and unveiled it as the Xbox Series X during The Game Awards in December. On September 8, 2020, Microsoft unveiled the Xbox Series S. 

Like the Xbox One, the consoles use an AMD CPU and GPU. Both models have solid-state drives to reduce loading times, support for hardware-accelerated ray-tracing and spatial audio, the ability to convert games to high-dynamic-range rendering using machine learning (Auto HDR), support for HDMI 2.1 variable refresh rate and low-latency modes, and updated controllers. Xbox Series X was designed to nominally render games in 2160p (4K resolution) at 60 frames per second (FPS). The lower-end, digital-only Xbox Series S, which has reduced specifications and does not include an optical drive, was designed to nominally render games in 1440p at 120 FPS, with support for 4K video scaling and ray tracing.

Xbox Series X/S are backwards-compatible with nearly all Xbox One-compatible games and accessories (including Xbox 360 and original Xbox games that were made backward-compatible with Xbox One);  the newer hardware gives games better performance and visuals. At launch, Microsoft encouraged a "soft" transition between generations, similar to PC gaming, offering the "Smart Delivery" framework to allow publishers to provide upgraded versions of Xbox One titles with optimizations for Xbox Series X/S. Publishers are not required to use Smart Delivery and may publish Xbox Series X/S-exclusive titles if they choose. Electronic Arts is among the developers that do not use Smart Delivery.

Critics praised the Xbox Series X/S for the hardware improvements over Xbox One and Microsoft's emphasis on cross-generation releases, but believed that the games available at launch did not fully use the hardware capabilities. Microsoft has not released sales data for the Xbox Series X/S but said on July 27, 2021, that they were the fastest-selling Xbox models to date. It was estimated that Microsoft had shipped at least 18.5 million units of the two consoles worldwide by December 2022.

History 
Industry rumors of new Xbox hardware had started as early as June 2018, with Microsoft's Phil Spencer confirming they were "deep into architecturing the next Xbox consoles" at that time. The hardware was believed to be a family of devices under the codename "Scarlett", including a low-cost version following a similar scheme as the Xbox One family of consoles, with major emphasis on game streaming and backward compatibility. By March 2019, further industry rumors had led to speculation of two consoles within the Scarlett family under codenames "Anaconda" and the low-cost "Lockhart" version.

Microsoft confirmed Project Scarlett at its E3 2019 press conference. Microsoft said they wanted a "soft" transition from Xbox One to Scarlett, with Scarlett supporting backward compatibility with all games and most hardware supported on the Xbox One. During a presentation at The Game Awards 2019, Microsoft officially revealed the design of Scarlett and its branding, "Xbox Series X", as well as a late 2020 release date. After the event, a Microsoft spokesperson said Xbox Series X was a fourth generation of Xbox hardware, which will be branded simply "Xbox" with no subtitle.

Microsoft planned to detail the hardware specifications and launch games for the Series X at the 2020 Game Developers Conference (GDC) and E3 2020, but the events were cancelled due to the COVID-19 pandemic. Microsoft scheduled online presentations over the same days in March 2020, while the company planned to reschedule its E3 presentation. Detailed specifications were presented by Microsoft, Digital Foundry, and Austin Evans of Overclock Media on March 16, 2020. Starting in May and running until launch, Microsoft planned to have more digital events around the Xbox Series X and its games as part of an "Xbox 20/20" series. This included an Xbox Games Showcase on July 23, 2020, featuring games principally from its first-party Xbox Game Studios.

On July 16, 2020, Microsoft announced that it had ended production of the Xbox One X and all-digital version of the Xbox One S in preparation for the new products.

The existence of the Xbox Series S had been guessed before E3 2019, based on a "Project Lockhart", a second, lower-end console that accompanied Scarlett. Confirmation of the Xbox Series S naming was affirmed through early Xbox hardware accessories that some had been able to purchase. Microsoft officially announced the Series S console on September 8, 2020, revealing that it would also be released alongside the Series X in November 2020. Microsoft pointed out that the Series S had been discreetly placed in the background of previous Xbox announcement videos featuring Phil Spencer during July 2020.

Hardware 
When Microsoft's Xbox development team started work on the successor to the Xbox One consoles around 2016, they had already envisioned the need to have two console versions similar to their Xbox One X and Xbox One S models to meet the needs of different markets. By developing both units in concert, they would be able to make sure games developed would be able to be played on both systems without exception. As has been tradition with past Xbox projects, the consoles were given code names based on cities. The Xbox Series S was named Project Lockhart, based on the city of Lockhart, Texas, which Aaron Greenberg said was known as "the little city with the big heart".

For the high-end console, the Xbox Series X, Microsoft's primary goals were to: at least double the graphical performance of the Xbox One X as measured by its floating point operations per second (FLOPS), and to increase CPU performance four-fold compared to Xbox One X while maintaining the same acoustic performance from the Xbox One consoles. As the engineers collected power requirements to meet these specifications, they saw these parts would draw a large amount of internal power (approximately 315 W) and would generate a significant amount of heat.

This led to the decision to split the components onto two separate circuit boards; one would house the CPU/GPU, memory, and power regulators, and a second board would act as a Southbridge board for slower input/output (I/O) functions. The boards mounted on opposite sides of an aluminum chassis helped to create air channels for cooling. The remaining components—the heat sink, the electric shielding, the power supply, the optical drive, and the cooling fan—were then arranged in a Tetris-like fashion, according to principal designer Chris Kujawski, to achieve a compact form factor, resulting in the tower-like structure. To meet the acoustics factor, the system includes numerous sensors for controlling the speed of the fan, and the large open top was necessary to ensure good airflow through the system. While certain elements like the optical drive, air flow requirements, and heat sink size fixed certain dimensions in the overall form factor, they were satisfied they were able to end up with a square footprint for the unit.

Xbox Series X 
Xbox head Phil Spencer said that Microsoft was prioritizing high frame rates and faster load times over higher resolutions; the Series X achieves this via the better-matched capabilities of the CPU and graphics processing unit. Compared to the Xbox One X, the CPU is about four times as powerful and the GPU twice as powerful.

The Xbox Series X is powered by a custom 7 nm AMD Zen 2 CPU with eight cores running at a nominal 3.8 GHz or, when simultaneous multithreading (SMT) is used, at 3.6 GHz. One CPU core is dedicated to the underlying operating system. The integrated GPU is also a custom unit based on AMD's RDNA 2 graphics architecture. It has a total of 56 compute units (CUs) with 3,584 cores, with 52 CUs and 3,328 cores enabled, and will run at a fixed 1.825 GHz. This unit is capable of 12 teraflops of computational power. The unit ships with 16 GB of GDDR6 SDRAM, with 10GB running at 560GB/s primarily to be used with the graphics system and the other 6 GB at 336 GB/s to be used for the other computing functions. After accounting for the system software, about 13.5 GB of memory will be available for games and other applications, with the system software only drawing from the slower pool. The Xbox Series X is intended to render games at 4K resolution at 60 frames per second, and can support up to 120 frames per second and can render up to 8K resolution.

The Xbox Series X's console form is designed to be unobtrusive and minimalistic. Designed to sit vertically, it can also be used on its side. Its front has the main power button and an Ultra HD Blu-ray drive. The top of the unit is a single powerful fan. Spencer said that the console is as quiet as the Xbox One X. The Series X includes an HDMI 2.1 output, the storage expansion slot, three USB 3.2 ports, and an Ethernet port. The console does not include an infrared blaster or HDMI pass-through like the Xbox One line, supporting HDMI-CEC instead. An earlier leak had suggested a TOSLINK port for digital audio, but this was eliminated in the final design. The console has an IR receiver in its controller pairing button next to the front USB port.

Xbox Series S 
The Xbox Series S is comparable in its hardware to the Xbox Series X, similar to how the Xbox One S relates to the Xbox One X, but has less processing power. While it runs the same CPU with slightly slower clock frequencies, it uses a slower GPU, a custom RDNA2 with 20 CUs at 1.55  GHz for 4 TFLOPS, compared to 12 TFLOPS of the Series X. It ships with 10 GB of RAM, with 8 GB running at 224GB/s primarily to be used with the graphics system and the other 2 GB at 56 GB/s to be used for the other computing functions, and a 512 GB SSD storage unit with a raw input/output throughput of 2.4 GB/s. It does not include an optical drive, so all games and software must be obtained digitally via Microsoft Store. It is intended to render games nominally at 1440p, with support for a 4K upscaler, at 60 frames per second, although it can go as high at 120 frames per second at this resolution. It starts at $299.99. Selected games can support native 4K resolution output on the Series S, such as Ori and the Will of the Wisps. Otherwise, the console has the same functions as the Xbox Series X, including ports, expansions, and game support.

Microsoft designed the Series S to easily fit inside of a small bag or backpack for portability and travel usage. In this orientation, its large side surface features the major exhaust port for active air cooling, similar to the top surface of the Series X; additional vents are then located on the top of the Series S. Like the Series X, the front of the Series S features one USB port and a controller pairing button with an integrated IR receiver. The rear of the console includes the power connector, one HDMI port, two additional USB ports, and an Ethernet port. Like the Series X, the Series S can also be placed horizontally with the exhaust port facing upward to maintain airflow. The Series S launched in a matte white case along with a matching controller, distinguishing it from the matte black that the Series X uses.

Common features

Xbox Velocity Architecture 

Both consoles use a new storage solution, the Xbox Velocity Architecture, that includes hardware and software components to improve transfer speeds within the console, reduce the size of digital downloads, and give developers more flexibility. Central to this is the internal storage, a custom NVM Express (NVMe) SSD.  On the Series X, this is a 1 TB SSD (802 GB available) with a raw input/output throughput of 2.4 GB/s. An on-board compression/decompression block includes both the industry standard zlib decompression algorithm and a proprietary BCPack algorithm geared for game textures, and it gives a combined throughput as high as 4.8 GB/s. Within the software, a new DirectStorage API within DirectX allows developers to fine-tune priority to input/output aspects with other processing threads. The software provides sampler feedback streaming that aids in loading multiple textures in segments to deal with level of detail rendering, rather than having to read these textures as a whole before using them. The Series S includes a 512 GB SSD (364 GB available) with similar custom hardware and software specifications. All SSD storage on the architecture use a PCI Express 4.0 x2 link.

Developers at The Coalition found that, without any changes to their code, Gears 5 loaded four times faster on Xbox Series X than Xbox One X due to the higher throughput on memory and storage and that they would be able to increase this further once they incorporated the new DirectStorage API routines.

The consoles support external storage through a proprietary SSD expansion card inserted into the back of the console, which was manufactured exclusively by Seagate Technology on launch and limited to a 1 TB size when first released. Later versions included 512 GB and 2 TB versions and were released at the end of 2021. As with the Xbox One, the consoles will also support external USB storage, but only backward compatible games (which can also be transferred directly from an Xbox One console) will be able to run directly from external USB storage. Xbox Series X- and S-native games must be stored on the internal SSD or an expansion card in order to be played, but they can be moved to a USB storage device to save disk space for other games.

The DirectStorage API was released in March 2022 for Windows-based computers for graphics cards that support DirectX 12 and NVMe SSDs, though games must be programmed to take advantage of the DirectStorage API. DirectStorage was planned to be a built-in feature along with Auto HDR for Windows 11 at release in late 2021, as well as offered within Windows 10.

Video and audio rendering technologies 
Both the Series X and Series S support real-time ray-tracing and support the new features of the HDMI 2.1 standard including variable refresh rate (VRR) and Auto Low Latency Mode (ALLM) that are currently being incorporated into newer televisions. The console will have dedicated audio hardware acceleration. A feature called "audio ray tracing" will use the graphics ray tracing processors to process spatial audio in the same manner to improve the audio immersion for the player.

Another goal for Microsoft was to reduce the effects of input latency to improve responsiveness, adding support for HDMI 2.1 Auto Low Latency Mode and Variable Refresh Rate features, and "dynamic latency input" technology—a new input pathway that allows developers to incorporate potential controller lag into their games.

AMD's FidelityFX Super Resolution, an image upscaling technology competitor to Nvidia's deep learning super sampling (DLSS) to enable higher resolutions and framerates, was added to the Xbox Series X/S in June 2021.

Both consoles support Dolby Vision and Dolby Atmos technologies. Dolby Vision was initially limited to streaming apps at launch, but was released for games in September 2021.

Comparison 
The following table is a comparison of the major components of the fourth generation of Xbox consoles.

Xbox Wireless Controller and accessories for Xbox Series X/S 

The Series X and Series S ship with an updated version of the Xbox Wireless Controller intended to fit a larger range of hand sizes. They include same key buttons as the past controllers: two analog joysticks that can be depressed, a circle pad, four action buttons, two system buttons ("View" and "Menu"), the main Xbox home button, two grip triggers (left and right), and two shoulder buttons (left and right). The new controller adds a "Share" button alongside the "View" and "Menu" buttons; pressing "Share" once takes a screenshot, while holding the button begins a Game DVR recording.

Microsoft found that by aiming the size to fit an eight-year-old's hands, they were able to make the design fit a larger section of the population; it thus features more sculpted grips, and has reduced and rounded trigger buttons. The D-pad is a new concave design that senior console designer Ryan Whitaker said was a means to merge the normal D-pad style on the standard Xbox One controller and the version on the Elite variant to accommodate a range of playstyles. Small tactile dot patterns have been added to the buttons to help players orient fingers on the controls. The controller continues to use two AA batteries, though a rechargeable battery pack is available as an accessory. Microsoft found from focus group studies that players were split nearly 50/50 on the use of batteries versus recharging and thus gave the controller the option to use either.

The controller uses the same wireless protocol introduced by the Xbox One and is backward compatible with existing Xbox One consoles. Existing Xbox One controllers are also compatible with Xbox Series X. The new controller also supports the Bluetooth Low Energy standard allowing it to pair with mobile devices and other hardware supporting that standard, and has internal storage to remember those connections. It uses a USB-C connector for wired use and charging (with the optional battery kit) rather than USB Micro-B.

Spencer said that the Xbox Series X will likely not have immediate virtual reality (VR) support at launch, and that they expect that any VR support will be based on the Windows Mixed Reality components contained within the console's Windows 10 components, but was otherwise not a focus of the console's development prior to release.

Software 

Both consoles have a similar user interface (UI) as the Xbox One, but use 40% less memory to improve its speed. According to the UI development team, the Home section loads in about half the time as it did on the Xbox One. Other changes include adding rounded UI elements, a more-readable font for text elements, rearrangement of certain aligned features, and improvements to the sharing functions. These changes were brought to the Xbox One system software, the Windows' Xbox application, and the Xbox mobile application around September 2020. Based on system previews, about 200 GB of space was reserved on the internal drive of the Xbox Series X for system files. 

Xbox Series S and Series X support "Quick Resume", which allows users to suspend and resume up to three games at once. Games can also be resumed after a reboot of the console. The March 2022 update added the ability to "pin" up to two games to Quick Resume, keeping them suspended unless otherwise closed manually, or the game must be updated.

As with previous Xbox consoles, Xbox Series S and Series X use the Xbox Live platform for online services. It supports the Xbox Game Pass service, which allows subscribers to download games from an on-demand library. In October 2021, Xbox Cloud Gaming—a component of Xbox Game Pass Ultimate which allows users to stream games from Microsoft servers to Xbox consoles, PCs, and mobile apps—was upgraded from Xbox One S-based hardware to Xbox Series X-based servers, enabling faster server-side loading times.

Apps for various streaming media services are available via Microsoft Store. The Apple TV app was released on Xbox platforms for the first time alongside the Xbox Series S and Series X.

Microsoft allows all retail Xbox Series X and Xbox Series S consoles to use an environment known as ‘Dev mode’, which provides developers with a sandbox environment to test their games and applications.

Games 

At launch of the Xbox Series X/S, Microsoft positioned new games to be available for both the Xbox One and the new consoles. Xbox Game Studios head Matt Booty said that Microsoft wanted to ensure that those who had recently bought Xbox One consoles would still "feel that they made a good investment and that we're committed to them with content." Spencer said many of the Xbox Game Studios subsidiaries were familiar with developing games on personal computers, where there is a wide range of hardware targets to meet. This approach allows the creation of games that perform well on the Xbox One consoles yet take advantage of the new hardware with higher graphics throughput and faster frame rates, ray tracing, and support for the consoles' storage architecture. 

For some games, further game improvements from the Xbox One version to Xbox Series X/S version can be made with the capabilities of the Xbox Series X/S console; games with this support are marketed with an "Optimized for Series X" logo. Microsoft offered a distribution framework known as "Smart Delivery" that will automatically download Xbox Series X/S versions of backwards compatible games for the console when available; Microsoft has positioned this feature at publishers who plan to release Series X- or Series S-specific versions of games after releasing on Xbox One and to users moving from an existing Xbox One to an Xbox Series console.

Microsoft does not bar developers from releasing games that can only be played on Xbox Series X, but the company has preferred a "soft" transition more in line with PC gaming, where developers can target optimal play on higher-end hardware, but still allow the game to be played with reduced fidelity on lower-end hardware (such as older Xbox One consoles).

Initially, Spencer suggested that their first-party studios' games would support both Xbox One and Xbox Series X platforms for the "next couple of years", but journalists observed that some of the first-party games introduced in the Xbox Game Showcase in July 2020 omitted mention of the Xbox One, and their websites later updated to omit mention of the Xbox One. While none of these games were believed to be launch titles, they were expected to be released within the window Spencer had previously suggested. This led to Aaron Greenberg, general manager of Xbox Games Marketing, to clarify that these games were being developed for the Xbox Series X first, leaving the choice of adding Xbox One support to their development studios as they went forward.

Microsoft has not placed any similar requirements on a soft transition for third-party developers and publishers, allowing them to offer Xbox Series X exclusives or other routes to upgrade from the Xbox One edition of a game, though Video Games Chronicle reported that Microsoft had urged publishers to keep the upgrade path free if they took that option. CD Projekt RED and Ubisoft have committed to using Smart Delivery for their upcoming releases. Electronic Arts affirmed that Madden NFL 21 will have a free update patch from the Xbox One version to the Xbox Series X version prior to the release of the next Madden NFL game.

The Xbox Game Preview program, which allows games to be released through an early access model, continued into the Xbox Series X/S line with Spacebase Startopia in January 2021.

Backward compatibility 

Microsoft stated that the Xbox Series X and Series S would support all existing games playable on Xbox One (excluding those that require the Kinect sensor), including Xbox 360 and original Xbox games currently supported through backward compatibility on the Xbox One, thus allowing the new consoles to support four generations of games.
To achieve this level of compatibility, Microsoft announced in June 2019 that they would no longer be bringing any additional Xbox 360 or original Xbox games into the Xbox One backward compatibility program, and they would instead be using their manpower to make sure these older games were playable on the Xbox Series X. Backward compatibility is a launch feature, with Microsoft having put more than 500,000 man-hours in validating thousands of games from the supported Xbox One library; Spencer said in December 2019 that he himself had been helping to test backward compatibility games. As Microsoft neared launch, they reopened the means for players to suggest additional games to add to backward compatibility, stating "Resurrecting titles from history often presents a complex mix of technical and licensing challenges, but the team is committed to doing everything we can to continue to preserve our collective gaming legacy."

It is possible for advanced graphic processes options not originally programmed into these older games to be worked into the game when played on the console, such as automated High-dynamic-range rendering (HDR) support using machine learning, framerate doubling, 16x anisotropic filtering, and resolution upscale. Work done by the Xbox Advanced Technology Group prior to launch was focused on how far into the backward-compatibility library they could take these improvements, including into original Xbox games, adding in features like HDR or improving the framerate of games that may have been programmed to be locked at a specific framerate. Backward compatible games are supported under the Quick Resume feature as well. Cloud saves can be used to migrate from Xbox One, and Microsoft stated that it would also add free cloud saves to the Xbox 360 so it can be migrated to a Series S/X console as well.

Xbox Series S can play Xbox One games with improved performance, texture filtering, and auto HDR support, but it does not support Xbox One X-specific enhancements. Microsoft is providing tools for developers to check the performance of their Xbox One games on the Series X and S consoles, which can suggest optimizations "as easy as changing three lines of code" to support the improvements in backward compatibility. In February 2021, Microsoft introduced FPS Boost, a feature for select backward-compatible games that the company said can improve the framerate of these titles on the Xbox Series X and Series S by two to four times. This is a feature that Microsoft's engineers must prepare for each game, with five games supported initially and more to be rolled out over time. Microsoft developed FPS Boost after finding that for many backward compatible games, the CPU and GPU on the newer consoles frequently entered their idle states even with the other enhancements in place, and so they sought ways to use the unused processing cycles to further enhance the older games' performance. As of May 2021, about 97 games were updated to support FPS Boost.

In March 2021, Microsoft started testing the Auto HDR feature with Windows-compatible games and computers that meet minimal requirements supported through DirectX.

Release and promotion 
In March 2020, Microsoft stated that despite the COVID-19 pandemic, they expected the Xbox Series X to ship by the end of 2020, though they were monitoring supply chains and the safety of their workers. Then, Spencer believed that while the hardware will continue to ship on time, games poised for the release window of Xbox Series X may be delayed due to the pandemic. By August 2020, Microsoft committed to a November 2020 release window for the Xbox Series X, affirming the console's release was still on track.

In China, the systems would release on June 10, 2021. Microsoft affirmed that 31 games would be available at launch, including those from its Xbox Game Studios and from other third-party publishers, in addition to those from its Xbox One backwards compatibility. While Halo Infinite had been planned as a launch title when the Series X console was first revealed, Microsoft and 343 Industries opted to delay its release until after the console's launch due to production issues related to the COVID-19 pandemic.

Microsoft will continue its Xbox All-Access financing plans (which bundle the hardware, Xbox Live Gold, and Xbox Game Pass as part of a monthly payment plan) for the Series X. Current All Access plans with the Xbox One will include routes to upgrade to the Xbox Series X, and Spencer states that there will be similar upgrades from the Xbox Series X in the future. The All-Access option for the Xbox Series X option will be based on a 24-month plan at  while the Series S will be based on a   plan.

Upon reveal of the Xbox Series X's vertical form factor, a popular Internet meme compared the design to a mini refrigerator. In the lead-up to the console's release, Microsoft manufactured a limited number of refrigerators modeled after the Xbox Series X exterior, complete with a disk drive handle, green interior ambient lighting, and the Xbox startup sound. Some were distributed to celebrities like Snoop Dogg and iJustine, and others were offered as part of promotional contests. In March 2021, in collaboration with Microsoft, Dwayne Johnson offered smaller mini-fridges modeled off the Xbox Series X to promote his line of Zoa energy drinks; Microsoft's Greenberg stated that this was a trial run to see if the Xbox mini-fridge would have potential sales options beyond this promotion. After followers of the official Xbox Twitter account helped the brand to win in a Twitter marketing vote-based championship in April 2021, Greenberg affirmed that Microsoft will proceed with producing Xbox Series X mini-fridges for purchase. Microsoft announced during E3 2021 that these mini fridges would be available to purchase by end-of-year holiday period in 2021. Microsoft opened pre-orders for the mini-fridge in October 2021, with plans for distribution in December 2021 in North America and European markets.

Reception 
At launch, critics praised the new console hardware and commented positively on its improved graphics, reduction of loading times, and strong backward compatibility support, but, due to the lack of any console exclusives, remained hesitant of the console's true power. Because of this, at launch, many did not feel these consoles truly represented the next generation of home consoles. The lack of significant launch-day exclusive titles designed to show off the new hardware capabilities, as well as the familiar controller shape and user interface, was considered by some to be disappointing given the next-generation focus of Sony's PlayStation 5. The Series X was generally considered the better unit when compared to the Series S, as the computation and space limitations of the latter made it a less user-friendly experience to navigate but still otherwise functional. Eurogamer's Richard Leadbetter stated "I love the hardware in terms of what I can potentially experience with it and the expert implementation of many of its forward-looking features—but a console is defined by its games, and in that sense, I still feel that I barely know the machine at all." Keza MacDonald of The Guardian said that while there is no immediate driving force to buy the consoles at launch, "there's not much to criticise: they do everything they promised to do, and they do it well." Gamasutra Kris Graft and Chris Kerr said that "Microsoft has delivered two highly appealing entry points that can turn players into long-term customers, while at the same time erasing the idea of 'generations,' exposing people to more games, past, present and future."

In November 2021, Jordan Ramée of GameSpot acknowledged that Xbox Series X and S had begun to see higher-profile console-exclusive releases since their launch (such as Forza Horizon 5, Psychonauts 2, and the third-party titles The Artful Escape and The Big Con), and that Smart Delivery was a "crucial" feature of the consoles—praising the system for being seamless and automatic unlike PlayStation 5, whose user interface "did not make it abundantly clear which version of a game you were choosing to download and play, occasionally resulting in players accidentally putting the PS4 version of a game on their PS5." He also felt that migrating from an older Xbox One was easier than migrating from PS4 to PS5, citing Smart Delivery, automatic synchronization of save data, and maintaining the same user interface.

Sales 
Microsoft announced that the Xbox Series X/S was the biggest Xbox console launch, with more consoles sold in more countries in its first 24 hours than any previous Xbox. The record was previously held by the Xbox One, which sold more than one million units at launch. The Xbox Series S has attracted a higher percentage of new Xbox players than any previous Microsoft consoles. Microsoft's CEO, Satya Nadella, would affirm in an earnings call on July 27, 2021 that the Series X and S consoles were the fastest selling Xbox consoles ever. Microsoft has not revealed the exact sales numbers of the Xbox Series X/S, having last revealed sales figure for Xbox consoles in 2014. However, estimates from industry analysts and exact sales from specific regions are available.

Daniel Ahmed, a Niko Partners analyst, has provided estimates for the worldwide sell-through of the Xbox Series X/S. The combined worldwide sales of the Xbox Series X and Series S would have reached 3.5 million by December 31, 2020. Sales would increase to 6.5 million by June 30, 2021, outpacing the 5.7 million units sold of the Xbox One and the 5 million units of the Xbox 360 in the same timeframe. Sales worldwide are estimated to have reached 8 million by September 30, 2021, and 12 million units by the end of 2021. At the end of 2022, it was estimated by Ampere Analysis that sales had reached 18.5 million.

Certified sales data are available in certain regions through providers, such as GfK in various regions of Europe. Famitsu also provides specific sales estimates in Japan. In the UK, 155,000 units were sold on launch day, two-thirds of which were Xbox Series X consoles. Sales in the region would reach 310,000 by the end of 2020, over 1 million by the end of 2021, and 1.8 million by the end of 2022. The Series X variety accounted for 43% of all the Xbox Series consoles sold over 2021 in the UK. In Japan, 16,247 Xbox Series X and 4,287 Xbox Series S systems were sold during the launch week, for a total of 20,534 units sold. Sales in Japan would cross 116,000 in November 2021, outselling the lifetime Japanese sales of the Xbox One in under a year. By the end of 2022, Xbox Series X/S reached 400,000 units sold in Japan. In Spain, there were 10,500 Xbox Series X and 3,600 Xbox Series S systems sold during the launch week for a combined total of 14,100 units sold. By the end of 2020, 30,850 Xbox Series X and S systems had been sold in Spain. 96,000 units were sold in Spain in 2022.

Shortages 
The 2020–present global chip shortage caused the supply of Xbox consoles to fall short of demand. Upon launch, with high demand outstripping supply for both models, the consoles almost immediately sold out across all retailers and in all markets. Spencer stated that they had gotten a later start on manufacturing the console in mid-2020 as they were waiting for key AMD chip technology to be in place, which reduced the availability of supply at launch, and though they had reached full production capacity by launch, they were still rushing to meet sales demand, as well as having made projections on proportions of Series X versus Series S sales. Xbox chief financial officer Tim Stuart has stated that shortages were likely to persist through the first quarter of 2021, but their supply chain was expected to be up to full capacity by the second quarter of the calendar year. Starting in May 2021, Microsoft offered those in the Xbox Insiders program the ability to sign up for its Console Purchase Pilot program to be placed on a priority list to purchase an Xbox Series X or Series S directly from Microsoft, though only a limited number of units will be offered through this program. Although Microsoft was unable to produce enough units to satisfy demand during 2021, the revenue from consoles increased over prior years, due to higher unit prices and large volumes sold.

Notes

References

External links 
 

 
2020 in video gaming
2020s toys
Backward-compatible video game consoles
Computer-related introductions in 2019
Home video game consoles
Microsoft video game consoles
Ninth-generation video game consoles
Products introduced in 2020
X86-based game consoles
Regionless game consoles